Stenispa is a genus of tortoise beetles and hispines in the family Chrysomelidae. There are at least 20 described species in Stenispa.

Species

References

Further reading

 
 
 
 
 
 
 
 
 
 
 

Cassidinae